Zombie Heaven is a 1997 four-disc box set comprising roughly the entire catalog of British invasion band The Zombies. The first disc comprises their debut Begin Here and assorted singles. The second disc features their second album Odessey and Oracle and the unreleased album R.I.P.. Disc 3 is composed of rare and unissued recordings, including demos, alternate takes, EP tracks, and R.I.P. tracks without the additional instrumentation, while the fourth disc collects live recordings from the band's appearance on the BBC.

The accompanying 64-page booklet features interviews with the original band members and associated friends and engineers, as well as a brief history of each song in the set and a timeline featuring nearly every Zombies tour date.

Track listing

Disc 1

Disc 2

Disc 3

Disc 4

References

The Zombies albums
Demo albums
BBC Radio recordings
1997 live albums
1997 compilation albums